Albert Torras Crespo (born 13 June 1996) is a Spanish footballer who plays for SCR Peña Deportiva as a midfielder.

Club career
Born in Vallgorguina, Barcelona, Catalonia, Torras joined FC Barcelona's La Masia in 2011, after representing RCD Espanyol and Penya Barcelonista Sant Celoni. On 12 August 2013, he moved abroad for the first time in his career and agreed to a three-year contract with Championship side Wolverhampton Wanderers.

On 18 July 2015, Torras returned to his homeland and joined Málaga CF, being assigned to the reserves in Tercera División. He made his senior debut on 22 August by starting in a 2–0 away win against CD Comarca del Mármol, and scored his first goal the following 13 March, in a 3–0 away defeat of Vélez CF.

On 19 January 2017, Torras moved to another reserve team, AD Almudévar, after agreeing to a 18-month contract. In July, he signed for Real Zaragoza and was assigned to the B-team.

On 9 June 2019, after scoring 12 goals during the campaign, Torras made his professional debut by coming on as a second-half substitute for Raúl Guti in a 0–1 Segunda División away loss against CD Tenerife.

References

External links

1996 births
Living people
People from Vallès Oriental
Sportspeople from the Province of Barcelona
Spanish footballers
Footballers from Catalonia
Association football midfielders
Segunda División players
Segunda División B players
Tercera División players
Atlético Malagueño players
AD Almudévar players
Real Zaragoza B players
Real Zaragoza players
SD Ejea players
Lleida Esportiu footballers
Wolverhampton Wanderers F.C. players
Spanish expatriate footballers
Spanish expatriate sportspeople in England
Expatriate footballers in England
RCD Espanyol footballers
FC Barcelona players
CD Calahorra players
Primera Federación players